The siege of Lachish was the Neo-Assyrian Empire's siege and conquest of the town of Lachish in 701 BCE. The siege is documented in several sources including the Hebrew Bible, Assyrian documents and in the Lachish relief, a well-preserved series of reliefs which once decorated the Assyrian king Sennacherib's palace at Nineveh.

Background

Several kingdoms in the Levant ceased to pay taxes to the Assyrian king Senncharib. In retribution, he initiated a campaign to re-subjugate the rebelling kingdoms, among them the Kingdom of Judah. After defeating the rebels of Ekron in Philistia, Sennacharib set out to conquer Judah and, on his way to Jerusalem, came across Lachish: the second most important of the Jewish cities.

Battlefield

The battlefield was the walled city of Lachish, situated on a hill. The northern part of the hill is steeper than the southern side and due to that the gate is situated there.
On top of the fact that the hill as of itself is quite high, the wall further makes the city hard to breach.
Inside the city itself there was a castle with significant walls.

Forces of each side

Assyrian army

The Assyrian Army was the most effective force of its time and was divided mostly into three different categories:
Infantry, which included both close-combat troops using spears, and archers. There were also hired mercenaries throwing stones (slingers). The infantry was highly trained and worked alongside military engineers in order to breach sieges.
Cavalry; Assyrian cavalry were among the finest in the ancient Middle East and included both close-combat cavalry units with spears and mounted archers, which could both use the agility of the horses alongside long-range attacks.
Chariots, which were not used as much in sieges as in regular land engagements.

Judean army

The Judean military force was insignificant compared to the professional and massive Assyrian army and mostly included local militias and mercenaries. There were barely any cavalrymen and chariots in the Judean army which mostly included infantry, either for close combat (spearmen) or long range combat (archers), they were also significantly less organized.

Siege

Due to the steepness of the northern side of Lachish the Assyrian Army attacked from the south, where the Jewish defenders situated themselves on the walls.
The Jewish defenders threw stones and shot arrows at the advancing Assyrians; the Assyrians started shooting arrows and stones themselves, creating a skirmish between the two armies. Meanwhile, Assyrian military engineers built a ramp to the east of the main gate where Assyrian and Jewish troops began engaging in close combat. The Assyrians meanwhile brought siege engines to the ramp and broke the wall; the Jewish defenders could not hold the Assyrian army and retreated, with some attempting to escape from the other side of the hill.

Subjugation

The city was captured by the Assyrians, its inhabitants led into captivity and the leaders of Lachish tortured to death. The town was abandoned, but resettled after the return from Babylonia.

Assyrian reliefs portraying the siege of Lachish clearly show battering rams attacking the vulnerable parts of the city.

The British Museum has a superb set of relief carvings which depicted the siege in some detail. It shows the Assyrian soldiers firing arrows, and slingstones, and approaching the walls of Lachish using mudbrick ramps. The attackers shelter behind wicker shields, and deploy battering rams. The walls and towers of Lachish are shown crowded with defenders shooting arrows, throwing rocks and torches on the heads of the attackers.

The captions for the relief at the British Museum say:

After the capture of Lachish, Assyrian soldiers carry off plunder from the governor's palace: a bundle of scimitars, round shields, a chariot, a throne, and a pair of incense-burners. Below, Judean prisoners move in families, taking their goods and animals with them into exile."

Panels 9–10

The procession of prisoners from Lachish continues, moving through a rocky landscape with vines, fig trees, and perhaps olives in the background. Officials regarded as responsible for the rebellion against Assyria are treated more severely: two of them are being flayed alive.

Panels 11–13

Sennacherib, on a magnificent throne, watches as prisoners are brought before him and sometimes executed.  There is a tent behind him, his chariot is in the foreground, and his bodyguard are stationed around. The King's face has been deliberately slashed, perhaps by an enemy soldier at the fall of Nineveh in 612 BC.

Panels 14–16

This panel, which closes the Lachish series, shows the base camp from which the siege was conducted. It is fortified, with a road through the middle.  Servants are at work in tents, and two priests are performing a ceremony in front of the chariots on which are mounted the standards of the gods.

The reliefs continues showing the looting of the city, and defenders are shown being thrown over the ramparts, impaled, having their throats cut and asking for mercy.  A bird's eye plan of the city is shown with house interiors shown in section.

Aftermath
After he captured the second most important city in Judah, Sennacherib encamped there and then sent his rabshakeh to capture Jerusalem.

Cultural references 
The Siege of Lachish is the subject of an eponymous song (and single) by metal band Melechesh.

Ancient sources
Lachish relief - A relief that was featured in Sennacherib's palace in Nineveh, it was identified by the text in it: "Sennacherib King of the Universe, King of Assyria, sits on a throne and the spoils of Lachish are paraded before him."

Further sources for the conflict in general:
Book of Kings
Book of Isaiah
Book of Chronicles
Sennacherib's Prism
Antiquities of the Jews, Titus Flavius Josephus

See also
 List of artifacts significant to the Bible
 List of conflicts in the Near East

References

Further reading
Edelman, Diana. 2000. "What If We Had No Accounts of Sennacherib's Third Campaign or the Palace Reliefs Depicting his Capture of Lachish?" Biblical Interpretation 8, nos. 1–2: 88–103.
Finkelstein, Israel, and Nadav Na'aman. 2011. The Fire Signals of Lachish: Studies In the Archaeology and History of Israel In the Late Bronze Age, Iron Age, and Persian Period In Honor of David Ussishkin. Winona Lake, IN: Eisenbrauns.
Ussishkin, David. 1982. The Conquest of Lachish by Sennacherib. Tel-Aviv: Tel Aviv University, Institute of Archaeology.
--. 2015. "Sennacherib's Campaign in Judah: The Conquest of Lachish." Journal for Semitics 24, no. 2: 719–58.
Ussishkin, David, and Miriam Feinberg Vamosh. 2015. Biblical Lachish: A Tale of Construction, Destruction, Excavation and Restoration. Jerusalem: Israel Exploration Society.

External links 

Images of the Assyrian Reliefs of Lachish

700s BC
8th century BC in the Kingdom of Judah
Lachish
Lachish
Lachish
Sennacherib
Lachish
Lachish